Innenstadt may refer to:

Innenstadt (Braunschweig), a district of Braunschweig, Germany
Innenstadt, Cologne, a district of Cologne, Germany
Innenstadt (Frankfurt am Main), a district of Frankfurt am Main, Germany 
Innere Stadt, a district of Vienna, Austria

See also
Inner city (disambiguation)